The 2020–21 Binghamton Bearcats men's basketball team represented Binghamton University in the 2020–21 NCAA Division I men's basketball season. They played their home games at the Binghamton University Events Center in Vestal, New York and were led by ninth-year head coach Tommy Dempsey. In a season limited due to the ongoing COVID-19 pandemic, they finished the season 4–14, 4–10 in America East play to finish in ninth place. They lost to Hartford in the first round of the America East tournament.

Previous season
The Bearcats finished the 2019–20 season 10–19, 4–12 in America East play to finish in last place. As a result, they failed to qualify for the America East tournament.

Roster

Schedule and results

Due to the ongoing COVID-19 pandemic, the Bearcats' schedule is subject to change, including the cancellation or postponement of individual games, the cancellation of the entire season, or games played either with minimal fans or without fans in attendance and just essential personnel.

The game vs. Robert Morris scheduled for December 12 was cancelled due to COVID-19 issues.
The game vs. Central Connecticut scheduled for December 22 was cancelled due to COVID-19 issues.
The two-game series vs. Maine scheduled for January 23–24 was postponed due to COVID-19 issues within the Maine program.
 The AEC scheduled a series vs. NJIT to replace the postponed series, but that series itself was eventually postponed due to COVID-19 issues within the Binghamton program.
The two-game series vs. NJIT scheduled for February 6–7 as well as the two-game series vs. Maine scheduled for February 13–14 were postponed because the Binghamton program paused all team activities due to COVID-19 issues.

|-
!colspan=12 style=| Non-conference regular season

|-
!colspan=12 style=| America East regular season

|-
!colspan=12 style=| America East tournament
|-

|-

Source

References

Binghamton Bearcats men's basketball seasons
Binghamton Bearcats
Bingham Bear
Bingham Bear